The Shaoshan 8 (SS8; Chinese: 韶山8) is a semi-high-speed electric locomotive used on the People's Republic of China's national railway system. The SS8 is based on its predecessor, the SS5, and was developed and built by CSR Zhuzhou Electric Locomotive Works.

Production
A total of 245 (0001–0243, 2001–2002) SS8s have been built since 1994. Batch production commenced in 1997.

Routes
The only route they were used on was the Jingguang line, the railway line linking Beijing West railway station with Guangzhou, Guangdong. The SS8 currently serves the Shanghai–Kowloon through train and the Beijing–Kowloon through train.

Speed record
The locomotive used was fleet number 0001.

Use on KCR
When the Guangzhou–Shenzhen railway was electrified, China Railway extended through trains into Hong Kong via the Kowloon–Canton Railway (KCR) East Rail line. These trains were initially hauled by an SS8 locomotive but their pantographs were considered harmful to KCR's catenary even after necessary conversions had been made. So, for a long time, China Railways DF11 diesel locomotives were used. After KCR provided their technical requirements of HK-compliance pantographs to China Railway, the company adapted some of their SS8's in order to meet the pantograph requirements. As of March 2010, the SS8 is still the only China Railway electric locomotive allowed to access Hong Kong.

External links
 SS8 on KCR East Rail Line YouTube
 SS8型电力机车_非人狂想屋

25 kV AC locomotives
Bo-Bo locomotives
SS8
Zhuzhou locomotives
Railway locomotives introduced in 1994
Standard gauge locomotives of China